Lydia Mokgokoloshi (born 27 September 1939) is a South African actress, best known for her role as Koko Mantsha and the mother of Charity Ramabu and grandmother of Katlego (Kat) and Joseph(Jojo) in the SABC 1 soap, Skeem Saam. Her most notable role was as Mma Nkwesheng in the 1980s drama, Bophelo ke Semphekgo.

Early life and education
She was born at a small village outside Polokwane called BOTLOKWA. She was a teacher before she got acting roles.

Career
She is well known for acting as Mma Nkwesheng, an evil, cruel mother-in-law on the popular Pedi TV drama, Bophelo ke semphekgo. She has also acted in a number of TV dramas like Ngwanaka Okae, Muvhango, and currently in Skeem Saam.

Filmography

Television

Awards and recognition
2017: Lifetime achievement award at the South African Film and Television awards

References

1939 births
Living people
People from Capricorn District Municipality
Northern Sotho people
South African actresses